The 2018 Bank of America Roval 400 was a Monster Energy NASCAR Cup Series race that was held on September 30, 2018, at Charlotte Motor Speedway in Concord, North Carolina. Contested over 109 laps on the  road course, it was the 29th race of the 2018 Monster Energy NASCAR Cup Series season, third race of the Playoffs, and final race of the Round of 16. This was the first race to use Charlotte's "Roval" road course layout.

Report

Background

For 2018, deviating from past NASCAR events at Charlotte, the race will utilize a road course configuration of Charlotte Motor Speedway, promoted and trademarked as the "Roval". The race will be contested over a scheduled distance of 109 laps, .

During July 2018 tests on the road course, concerns were raised over drivers "cheating" designated chicanes on the course. The chicanes were modified with additional tire barriers and rumble strips in order to encourage drivers to properly drive through them, and NASCAR will enforce drive-through penalties on drivers who illegally "short-cut" parts of the course. The chicanes will not be used during pace laps, nor will they be used during restarts.

Entry list

First practice

Qualifying

Qualifying results

Practice (post-qualifying)

Second practice

Final practice

Race

Stage Results

Stage 1
Laps: 25

Stage 2
Laps: 25

Final Stage Results

Stage 3
Laps: 59

Race statistics
 Lead changes: 8 among different drivers
 Cautions/Laps: 8 for 16
 Red flags: 1 for 14 minutes and 27 seconds
 Time of race: 3 hours, 1 minute and 34 seconds
 Average speed:

Media

Television
NBC Sports covered the race on the television side. Rick Allen, Jeff Burton, Steve Letarte and Dale Earnhardt Jr. had the call in the booth for the race. Parker Kligerman called from different locations around the 17-turn ROVAL. Dave Burns, Marty Snider and Kelli Stavast reported from pit lane during the race.

Radio
The Performance Racing Network had the radio call for the race, which was simulcast on Sirius XM NASCAR Radio.

Standings after the race

Manufacturers' Championship standings

Note: Only the first 16 positions are included for the driver standings.

References

External links

Bank of America Roval 400
Bank of America Roval 400
NASCAR races at Charlotte Motor Speedway
Bank of America Roval 400